Martin Krasimirov Paskalev (born 25 December 2001) is a Bulgarian professional footballer who plays as a centre-back for Lokomotiv Plovdiv.

Career
Born in Svilengrad, Paskalev played as a youth for local club FC Svilengrad, CSKA Sofia and Lokomotiv Plovdiv.

He made his debut for the first team of Lokomotiv Plovdiv on 19 April 2019 in a 0:2 loss to Dunav Ruse. He scored his first goal for Lokomotiv on 12 September 2022 for the 1:0 win against Septemvri Sofia, becoming a man of the match.

Honours
Lokomotiv Plovdiv
Bulgarian Cup (1): 2018–19

References

External links

2001 births
Living people
Bulgarian footballers
FC Spartak Varna players
PFC Lokomotiv Plovdiv players
First Professional Football League (Bulgaria) players
Association football defenders
People from Plovdiv